WPP-Scangroup is a subsidiary of WPP and is listed on the Nairobi Securities Exchange. It is the largest marketing and communication group operating a multi-agency model across multiple disciplines in Sub-Saharan Africa. The group comprises the ad agencies Ogilvy Africa, SCANAD, JWT and BluePrint Marketing; media firms GroupM, MediaCom Africa, Mindshare and MEC; public relations agencies Ogilvy PR (a part of Ogilvy Africa) and H+K Strategies; market research agency Millward Brown; specialty communication firms Roundtrip and Geometry Global; and digital companies OgilvyOne, Squad Digital and SCANAD Digital. In all, over 1200 people are employed across the various organizations.

WPP-Scangroup is listed on the Nairobi Securities Exchange. The group has presence in 25 countries in Sub Saharan Africa. Majority-owned offices in Ghana, Kenya, Nigeria, Rwanda, South Africa, Tanzania, Uganda, Zambia and minority owned operations in Burkina Faso, Cameroon, Gabon, Ivory Coast, Namibia, Senegal and Zimbabwe. The group also has affiliate partners in Botswana, DRC, Congo Brazzaville, Madagascar, Malawi, Mauritius, Mozambique, Niger, Reunion and S. Leone.

History
Scangroup Limited was incorporated in Kenya as a private limited liability company on 26 January 1999 under the name Media Initiative East Africa Limited. In October 2005 the company changed its name to Scangroup Limited. Scangroup listed on the Nairobi Securities Exchange on 29 August 2006 and is currently the only marketing services company listed on the exchange. In late 2013 Scangroup became a subsidiary of WPP and subsequently the company renamed itself to WPP-Scangroup Limited on 15 June 2015.

Ownership
Since 2006, the company stock is listed on the Nairobi Stock Exchange, where it trades under the symbol:SCAN. Its largest shareholder is the WPP Group, controlling 50.10% of the issued share capital of Scangroup though its subsidiaries Cavendish Square Holding BV and Ogilvy South Africa.  , the ten largest investors in the company were:

WPP-Scangroup Companies
The companies within Scangroup include, but are not limited to the following:

 Ogilvy Kenya Limited, Nairobi, Kenya
 Milward Brown East Africa Limited, Nairobi, Kenya
 Ogilvy Africa, Nairobi, Kenya
 O&M Africa BV, Netherlands
 Hill & Knowlton East Africa Limited, Nairobi, Kenya
 Ogilvy Tanzania Limited, Dar es Salaam, Tanzania
 Redsky Limited, Nairobi, Kenya
 Scanad Kenya, Nairobi, Kenya
 Scanad East Africa Limited, Nairobi, Kenya
 BroLl WesT™, Nairobi, Kenya
 J. Walter Thompson Kenya Limited, Nairobi, Kenya
 Squad Digital Limited, Nairobi, Kenya
 Mediacompete East Africa Limited, Nairobi, Kenya
 Grey East Africa Limited, Nairobi, Kenya
 Scanad Uganda Limited, Kampala, Uganda
 Scanad Tanzania Limited, Dar es Salaam, Tanzania
 Roundtrip Limited, Nairobi, Kenya

See also
 WPP Group Plc
 Ogilvy & Mather
 Nairobi Stock Exchange
 Economy of Kenya

References

External links
Profile At Google Finance
Website of Scangroup
Website of WPP Group Plc
Website of Squaddigital Limited
Scangroup Launches Digital Advertising Division

1996 establishments in Kenya
Companies listed on the Nairobi Securities Exchange
Companies based in Nairobi